Ralph Davis Brown II (born September 16, 1978) is a former American college and professional football player who was a cornerback in the National Football League (NFL) for ten seasons.  He played college football for the University of Nebraska, and was a consensus All-American.  He played professionally for the New York Giants, Minnesota Vikings, Cleveland Browns and Arizona Cardinals of the NFL.

Early years
Brown was born in Los Angeles, California.  He attended Charles Bursch Elementary School in Baldwin Park, California as a child where he grew up. He also attended Bishop Amat Memorial High School in La Puente, California, where he was listed as the second-best defensive back in the country by Blue Chip and named to the Dream Team in 1995. He was named to USA Todays second-team All-America squad in the same year. During Ralph's senior season, he was seventh in the state in rushing with 2,246 yards on 311 carries and scored the game-winning touchdown in the Lancers' Division I championship win over Los Angeles' Loyola High in 1995. He earned CIF Southern Section Player of the Year and MVP, and the Los Angeles Times Back-of-the-Year honors, scoring 29 times, including a school-record 6 in one game.  Defensively, he had 57 tackles and six interceptions. He also lettered three times in track. As a sophomore and junior Brown notched all-state honors as a cornerback.

College career
Brown attended the University of Nebraska, where he played for the Nebraska Cornhuskers football team from 1996 to 1999. He finished career with 143 tackles, including 88 solo and is third on the Cornhuskers career list with 11 interceptions and first with 253 interception return yards. Brown also set a school record with 50 pass deflections.  He was recognized as a consensus first-team All-America, having been named to the  first teams of Walter Camp, College Football News and the Sporting News as a senior in 1999.  He was also a semifinalist for the Jim Thorpe Award, given to the top defensive back in the country.  In 1997 and 1998, he was an All-Big Twelve Conference first team selection. Brown was then an All-American third-team pick by the Associated Press and College Football News in 1998.  He became a member of the Big Twelve Commissioner's Academic Honor Roll in 1997. One of six true freshmen who saw action for the Huskers in 1996, but the only one who earned a starting role. Brown became the first position player at Nebraska to start his first game as a true freshman since World War II.

College statistics

Notes - Statistics include bowl game performances.

Professional career
He was drafted in the fifth round (140th overall) of the 2000 NFL Draft by the New York Giants. He played four seasons with the Giants from 2000–2003. In his first year Brown played in two games. He was inactive for the season opener vs. Arizona and saw his 1st NFL action at Philadelphia, playing only on special teams. His only action was on special teams at Chicago. He was forced to leave game in the 3rd quarter after taking a knee to the abdomen. Brown's injury was diagnosed as a laceration to the kidney. He was placed on season-ending injured reserve on October 2.

Next year played in eight games, with no starts and finished season with two assisted tackles on defense and five special teams tackles (4 solo).
2002 was his best year so far, he played in all 16 games, including his first two NFL starts, at St. Louis and at Washington. He was a reserve in NFC Wild Card game at San Francisco. He began the season as the dime (sixth) cornerback, but also played nickel corner. He finished with 25 tackles (19 solo), one interception, one fumble recovery, three passes defensed and eight special teams tackles (six solo).

In his last season with the Giants, Brown contributed in the secondary as a reserve and spot starter and on special teams, providing depth to the defensive backfield. He demonstrated nose for the ball on several key plays last season. Brown played in 11 games, starting seven. He missed three games with a shoulder injury and was assigned to injured reserve prior to Week 16 at Dallas. He finished the season with 41 tackles (28 solo), one sack, one forced fumble, two interceptions and one touchdown.

Brown also played for the Minnesota Vikings from 2004 to 2005, the Cleveland Browns in 2006, and the Arizona Cardinals from 2007 through 2009.

See also
 History of the New York Giants (1994–present)

References

1978 births
Living people
American football cornerbacks
Arizona Cardinals players
Cleveland Browns players
Minnesota Vikings players
Nebraska Cornhuskers football players
New York Giants players
All-American college football players
People from the San Gabriel Valley
Sportspeople from Los Angeles County, California
People from Hacienda Heights, California
Players of American football from California
African-American players of American football
21st-century African-American sportspeople
20th-century African-American sportspeople